DFCU Bank, registered as the Development Finance Company of Uganda Bank Limited, is a commercial bank in Uganda. It is licensed by the Bank of Uganda (BoU), Uganda's central bank and national banking regulator.

Overview
As of December 2021, DFCU Bank had total assets of UGX:3.136 trillion (US$882.8 million), and shareholders' equity of UGX:594.03 billion (US$167.2 million).

As of 30 June 2017, dfcu Bank operated 67 branches and 100 automated teller machines. As of 30 June 2020, the bank's total assets had increased to UGX:3.442 trillion (US$939 million), with shareholders' equity of UGX:599.65 billion (US$163.54 million).

History
The Development Finance Company of Uganda Limited was established in 1964, with its name changing in 2000 to DFCU Limited and eventually to dfcu Limited. In 2000, dfcu Limited acquired Gold Trust Bank, which subsequently became dfcu Bank.

In July 2014, the BoU transferred to dfcu Bank the customer deposits of the Global Trust Bank, a small retail financial institution that the BoU had closed because it never became commercially viable. The deposits were valued at UGX:73 billion.

On 27 January 2017, dfcu Bank took over Crane Bank, which had been under the statutory management of the BoU because Crane's liabilities exceeded its assets. The acquisition included all customer deposit accounts and some loan accounts.

Ownership and affiliation
The stock of dfcu Limited, the parent company of dfcu Bank, trades on the Uganda Securities Exchange under the symbol "DFCU". As of December 2018, the major shareholders in the stock were as outlined in the table below:

1. DFCU Bank is a subsidiary of DFCU Limited.
2. Arise BV is a special purpose vehicle company, formed in 2016 and co-owned by Norfund, the Netherlands Development Finance Company, and Rabobank. Arise invests in African financial institutions.
3. In July 2018, the New Vision newspaper in Uganda reported that CDC Group had indicated its desire to exit the investment.

Branch network
With its headquarters in Kampala, DFCU Bank had the following
branches in all areas of Uganda as of April 2020. In February 2020, the bank relocated 15 of its branches to new premises, as listed below.

 Sixth Street Branch: Ramzam Motors Building, Plot 116/118, Sixth Street, Industrial Area, Kampala
 Abayita Ababiri Branch: S&S Mall, Plot. 863, Nkumba
 Abim Branch: 8 Lira-Kotido Road, Abim
 Bugoloobi Branch: Kagga House, 2 Bandali Rise, Bugoloobi, Kampala
 Bwaise Branch: 975-976 Sir Apollo Kaggwa Road, Bwaise, Kampala
 Entebbe Road Branch: Freedom City Mall, Namasuba, Kampala
 Impala House Branch: Impala House, 13 Kimathi Avenue, Kampala
 Jinja Road Branch: Victoria University Towers, 38 Jinja Road, Kampala
 Kampala Road Branch: Plot. 40, Kampala Road, Kampala
 Sun City Branch: Sun City Plaza, 17 Ben Kiwanuka Street, Kampala 
 Kawempe Branch: Kampala-Gulu Highway, Kawempe, Kampala
 Kikuubo Branch: Ddembe Plaza, Nakivubo Road, Kampala
 Kireka Branch: Isabella Plaza, Plot. 395, Kireka
 Kisekka Branch: Kisekka Market, 70 – 76 Nakivubo Road, Kampala
 Kyadondo Road Branch - DFCU House, 26 Kyaddondo Road, Nakasero, Kampala Main Branch
 Kyambogo University Branch: Kyambogo University, Kyambogo, Kampala
 Kyambogo Branch: 48/50, Mukabya Road, Kyambogo, Kampala
 Lugogo Branch: Lugogo Mall, Lugogo Bypass Road, Lugogo, Kampala
 Makerere Branch: 45 Pool Road, Makerere University Campus, Kampala
 Market Street Branch: Aponye City Mall, 8 Burton Street, Kampala
 Naalya Branch: Quality Shopping Mall, Naalya
 Nakivubo Branch (Gagawala Shauliyako): 40A, Nakivubo Place, Kampala
 Acacia Branch: 24 Acacia Avenue, Kololo, Kampala
 Agago Branch: 1 Odok Road, Agago Town Council
 Arua Branch: OB Plaza, Plot. 9 & 11, Adumi Road, Arua
 Busia Branch: 101 & 103 Customs Road, Busia, Uganda
 Dokolo Branch: Akeidebe Zone, Bata Road, Dokolo
 Entebbe Town Branch: 22 Kampala Road, Entebbe
 Gulu Branch: 1 Doctor Lucile Road, Gulu
 Gulu University Branch: DFI Block, University Avenue, Gulu University Campus, Gulu
 Hoima Branch: Plot. 36, Main Street, Main Street, Hoima
 Ibanda Branch: Plot. 82, Kamwenge Road, Ibanda
 Iganga Branch: 80 & 82 Main Street, Iganga 
 Ishaka Branch: 45 Ishaka-Rukungiri Road, Ishaka
 Isingiro Branch: 36 Kikagate Road, Isingiro
 IUIU Branch: Islamic University in Uganda Campus, Mbale
 Jinja Branch: Plot. 10 Scindia/Lady Alice Muloki Road, Jinja
 Kabale Branch: 143/145 Kabale Road, Kabale
 Kisoro Branch: 65/75 North Ward, Kisoro
 Kitgum Branch: 19 Janan Luwum Street, Kitgum
 Kyengera Branch: Kyengera Shell Service Station, Masaka Road, Kyengera
 Luweero Branch: 846 Kampala–Gulu Highway, Luweero
 Luwum Street Branch: Kizito Towers, Luwum Street, Kampala
 Lyantonde Branch: Plot. 226, Block. 76, Lyantonde
 Masaka Branch: 22 Kampala Road, Masaka
 Mbale Branch: 2 Court Road, Mbale
 Mbarara Branch: Plot. 14, Masaka–Mbarara Road, Mbarara
 Mukono Branch: 18/20 Jinja Road, Mukono
 Nateete Branch: 757 Wakaliga, Nateete, Kampala
 Ndeeba Branch: 224 Masaka Road, Ndeeba, Kampala
 Nsambya Branch: 1207 Ggaba Road, Nsambya, Kampala
 Ntinda Branch 1: Capital Shoppers City, Ntinda Road, Ntinda, Kampala
 Ntinda Branch 2: Plot. 1615 Tuskys Supermarket Building, Ntinda–Bukoto Road, Ntinda, Kampala
 Ntungamo Branch: 18 Old Kabale Road, Ntungamo
 Owino Market Branch - 769 Kafumbe Mukasa Road, Kampala
 Pader Branch: 8 Lagwai Zone B, Pader
 Pallisa Branch: 8 Kasodo Road, Pallisa
 Rushere Branch: 52–54 Rushere Road, Rushere
 Soroti Branch: Jovi House, Plot. 47 Gweri Road, Soroti
 Tororo Branch: 9 & 11 Mbale Road, Tororo
 William Street Branch: 66 William Street, Kampala
 Wilson Lane Branch: 17 Wilson Lane, Kampala.

DFCU House

dfcu Limited has built a ten-story headquarters building that also houses the main branch of dfcu Bank. The building is often referred to as DFCU House. Located at 26 Kyaddondo Road, on Nakasero Hill, in Kampala's central business district, the development has underground and surface parking, as well as rentable, retail, and office space on several levels.

See also
 Banking in Uganda
 List of banks in Uganda
 List of tallest buildings in Kampala
 Asset allocation among commercial banks in Uganda

References

External links
 Fair valuation in acquisition of Crane by dfcu Bank: Effects and prospects (6 April 2018).

Banks of Uganda
Banks established in 1964
DFCU Group
1964 establishments in Uganda
Companies listed on the Uganda Securities Exchange
Companies based in Kampala